Bellara is a suburb of Bribie Island in the Moreton Bay Region, Queensland, Australia.

Geography
Bellara  is on the western side of Bribie Island, adjacent to the Pumicestone Channel which separates the island from the mainland Queensland. Bribie Island Bridge connects Bellara and Bongaree to Sandstone Point on the mainland.

There is a long sandy beach called Sylvan Beach along the coast of the suburb extending north to Banksia Beach and south to Bongaree.

History
The name Bellara was approved by the Queensland Place Names Board on 1 July 1961. It is an Aboriginal word meaning good. 

The median age of the Bellara population was 54 years, 17 years above the national median of 37. 77.2% of people living in Bellara were born in Australia. The other top responses for country of birth were England 6.5%, New Zealand 3.9%, Scotland 1.1%, Germany 0.7%, Netherlands 0.6%. 92.6% of people spoke only English at home; the next most common languages were 0.4% French, 0.3% Tagalog, 0.3% German, 0.3% Italian, 0.2% Serbian.

In the  Bellara had a population of 3,225 people.

Education
There are no schools in Bellara. The nearest government primary schools are Banksia Beach State School in neighbouring Banksia Beach to the north and Bribie Island State School in neighbouring Bongaree to the south. The nearest government secondary school is Bribie Island State High School, also in Bongaree.

References

External links 

 

Suburbs of Moreton Bay Region
Bribie Island